The Dawn is a Filipino rock band which first achieved commercial success during the late 1980s in the Philippines. The band broke up in 1995 with lead vocalist Jett Pangan forming another band, the Jett Pangan Group. The Dawn reunited in late 1999. The Dawn is considered the "longest-lived and most prolific rock band in the Philippines".

History

Formation and early years (1985–1988)
The Dawn was formed in 1985 by Teddy Diaz (vocals and guitars), JB Leonor (drums), and Clay Luna (bass). The band's name was derived from a portrait of the Holy Spirit that symbolized the dawn of a new day (probably found in a book given by the Sisters of the Holy Spirit to Teddy Diaz, as well as a crucifix which Teddy also received from the same sisterhood), called The Dawning of the Holy Spirit. Diaz, Leonor and Luna initially wanted a female vocalist; but in the course of their search, Jett Pangan auditioned and got the trio's unanimous nod. The quartet began performing in clubs and eventually recorded a demo of a song entitled "Enveloped Ideas", a copy of which they submitted to DWXB 102.7, a now-defunct Metro Manila-based FM radio station that played alternative rock and new wave music. It topped the radio station's charts in 1986, helping the group gain a cult following. While The Dawn was in search of a major record label, Luna left the band to immigrate to the US. Carlos "Caloy" Balcells, bass player of another Filipino group, the Cicada Band, soon replaced him. In 1986, The Dawn signed with OctoArts International (now PolyEast Records Philippines) and, the next summer, released their self-titled debut album, which gained commercial success. Many critics felt that The Dawn would fill the void left behind by the Juan de la Cruz Band when their music slowly faded in the 1980s. Heavily influenced by the new wave genre of the 1980s, "Enveloped Ideas" is distinct for its introductory operatic vocals a la Klaus Nomi.

Diaz's death, new guitarist, later albums and disbandment (1988–1995)
At the height of their popularity, and just weeks after the release of their second album I Stand with You, containing the title track, "Magtanim Ay 'Di Biro" and "Love (Will Set Us Free)", Diaz was stabbed to death in front of his girlfriend's house on 21 August 1988 by two men allegedly under the influence of drugs and alcohol. Despite the demise of Diaz, his influence is still felt among many guitarists today and he has become a legend among many Filipino musicians. The Dawn still considers Diaz to be the band's driving force to this day.

The band continued to play, at one time employing the services of a masked guitarist (nicknamed "Zorro" by some fans - is actually rock guitar virtuoso Noel Mendez who will eventually form the band HAYP) in the absence of a permanent guitar player. Atsushi Matsuura, a Japanese guitarist who had earlier released a solo album in the Philippines under Ivory Records, took on lead guitar duties in January 1989 as the band released Beyond the Bend. Matsuura was featured on the music video of "Salamat".

He was later replaced by Francis Reyes, former Afterimage guitarist, who was also a DJ at NU-107, a local alternative rock radio station. Reyes also happened to be Diaz's close friend. Classically trained session keyboardist Millette Saldajeno also joined the band in 1990 but was later replaced by Isidore Fernandez in 1992.

In 1995, the band went their separate ways due to Pangan's desire to move on with another career. Pangan then formed the Jett Pangan Group.

The 1997 reunion at the ULTRA brought the band back on-stage and, for the first time, the band employed two guitarists: Matsuura and Reyes. They did another reunion show at the now defunct ABG's along Pasong Tamo, while they were discussing a comeback release through Sony Music Philippines (now Sony BMG Music Philippines).

Reunion, US shows, Prodigal Sun and Harapin (1999–2005)
On 31 December 1999, they reunited with both Francis Reyes and Atsushi Matsuura on guitars and performed on GMA Networks' 2000 Global Millennium Day Broadcast in Ayala Avenue in Makati. That year, they also recorded Prodigal Sun which was released on 2001, an album that, much like the parable of the Prodigal Son, symbolized their return to the music scene.

2001 saw the band actively engaged in the live circuit, embarking on an eight-city US tour and were in New York City when 9/11 turned the World Trade Center into ground zero. In 2003, Carlos Balcells left the band in order to perform his duties as city councilor in his native Talisay City, Negros Occidental. Wolfgang's bass player Mon Legaspi took his place in the band. A few months later, the band once again parted with Matsuura and returned to being a quartet.

In 2004, the band released Harapin (Filipino, "To Face"), featuring singles such as Tulad ng Dati ("Just Like Before") and Laging Narito ("Always Here"). In October 2005, bass player Mon Legaspi amicably left the band to pursue other projects and was replaced by Buddy Zabala, formerly of The Eraserheads. Around this time, The Dawn also contributed to the APO Hiking Society tribute album kami nAPO muna with a cover of Bawat Bata ("Every Child").

Tulad ng Dati, Later Half of Day (2006–2009)
In 2006, an independent film based on the band's history was released. Tulad Ng Dati (Just Like Before, as entitled in the Pusan International Film Festival) won Best Editing, Best Sound, and Best Picture in the Cinemalaya Independent Film Festival. It was also the country's entry to the Hawaii International Film Festival. The Dawn's 20th anniversary album, a two-disc set of the same title, was released in October of the same year. Disc one contains re-recordings of their hits through the years and the carrier single Ang Iyong Paalam ("Your Farewell"), while disc two contains videos, including rare footage of Teddy Diaz doing a guitar solo. In October 2008, The Dawn launched their tenth studio album, The Later Half of Day, their first album in two years since the last released in 2006. It featured jazz re-arrangements of their old songs.

Reyes' departure, Sound the Alarm (2009–2013)
Francis Reyes, who had been with the band for the last 18 years, left on 16 April 2009 after what Jett Pangan called a "hard meeting". Pangan also went on to state that Reyes was welcome to rejoin the band. He was replaced by Kenneth Ilagan, days later. In July 2009, the band launched their eleventh studio album, Sound the Alarm. The album features Kenneth Ilagan, formerly of True Faith and Xaga (a precursor to Rivermaya).

Sancho's arrival, Simulan na Natin EP (2013–2015)
In 2013 in a Myx.com interview, Pangan stated, "I think I'm gonna write more songs". On 14 July 2014, they released a new single entitled "Habulan". Guitarist Rommel "Sancho" Sanchez, known as a member of Cynthia Alexander's band joined the Dawn on 8 August 2014. Sanchez's first performance with the Dawn was at the Music Museum. This event marked the launch of their new single "Landmarks". 
On 9 December 2015, the Dawn was awarded the Dangal ng Musikang Pilipino at the 2015 Awit Awards held at the Music Museum.
They released their first EP, Simulan Na Natin on 16 December 2015 which was available in record stores and then on 10 January 2016 through iTunes.
On 10 February 2016, the band launched their YouTube channel which also launched a new music video for "The Way It Turns".

Band members' return, anniversary shows, and Ascendant (2016–present)
On 7 June 2016, the band underwent another line-up change as bassist Buddy Zabala left the band due to unknown reasons, while bassist Carlos Balcells and guitarist Francis "Brew" Reyes were brought back, thus returning as a quintet for the first time since 2004.

By the later dates in June and July 2016, Mon Legaspi briefly returned to the band filling bass duties for Balcells who was unavailable at that time. Legaspi would begin touring with them months later and would eventually be the band's regular bassist and Balcells being mostly pre-occupied with their family businesses. This year would also mark the band's 30th anniversary. In line with the celebrations, they held a concert last 17 September 2016 dubbed The Dawn Trenta at Craft BGC in Taguig City. They would later perform at the Trenta Repeat concert on 5 November 2016 at the Music Museum. They would perform a follow-up to their 30th anniversary concert dubbed "Trenta y Uno" on 31 March and also announced they will be having a US and Canada tour on the third quarter of the year.

On 11 October 2017, vocalist Jett Pangan made a Facebook post that the band had begun writing and recording for their upcoming 12th studio album. The band released the songs "Merry Go Round" and "Segurista" as well as the album Ascendant by way of a major concert at The Music Museum on 28 July 2018 with the newest song being "Made of You".

On October 3, 2022, bassist Mon Legaspi, passed away at the age of 54 due to cardiac arrest.

Band members

Current members
JB Leonor – drums (1985–1995, 1999–present)
Jett Pangan – lead vocals, guitar, keyboards (1985–1995, 1999–present)
Francis Reyes – guitars, backing vocals, keyboards (1990–1995, 1999–2009, 2016–present)
Rommel Sanchez – guitars (2014–present)
Bim Yance – bass (2023–present; touring 2022–2023)

Current touring/session members
Leni Llapitan – keyboards (2002–present)

Former members
Clay Luna – bass (1985)
Teddy Diaz – vocals, guitars, keyboards (1985–1988, died 1988)
Atsushi Matsuura – guitars, backing vocals, keyboards (1989, 1999–2004)
Kenneth Ilagan – guitar (2009–2014)
Buddy Zabala – bass, backing vocals (2005–2016)
Carlos Balcells – bass, backing vocals (1985–1995, 1999–2003, 2016–2017)
Mon Legaspi – bass, backing vocals (2003–2005, 2017–2022; touring 2016–2017, died 2022)

Former touring/session members
Noel Mendez (a.k.a. Zorro) – guitar (1988)
Millette Saldajeno – keyboards (1990–1992)
Dodo Fernandez – keyboards (1992–1995, 1999–2002)
Kit Mendoza – guitar (2014)

Discography

Studio albums
The Dawn (1987), OctoArts International
I Stand with You (1988), OctoArts International
Beyond the Bend (1989), OctoArts International
Heart's Thunder (1990), OctoArts International
Abot Kamay (1992), OctoArts International
Puno't Dulo (1994), OctoArts International
Prodigal Sun (2000), Sony BMG Music
Harapin (2004), Warner Music Philippines
Tulad ng Dati (2006), Warner Music Philippines
The Later Half of Day (2008), MCA Music Philippines
Sound the Alarm (2009), Sony Music Philippines
Ascendant (2018), Solstice Ventures Inc.

Compilation albums
Iisang Bangka Tayo (1992), OctoArts International
The Dawn: OPM Timeless Collection Gold Series (1997), OctoArts-EMI Music
The Story of The Dawn: The Ultimate OPM Collection (2001), EMI Philippines

Live albums
The Dawn: Live (1989), OctoArts International

Extended plays
Simulan Na Natin (2015), Solstice Ventures Inc. (CD, iTunes)

Music videos
"Salamat" (1989)
"Iisang Bangka Tayo" (1992) - finalist as Best Southeast Asian Music Video at the 1992 MTV Music Video Awards
"Paano Naman Kami" (2002)
"Harapin ang Liwanag" (2004)
"Change" (2004)
"Tulad ng Dati" (2005)
"Ang Iyong Paalam" (2006)
"Message in a Bottle" (2008)
"Hatak" (2009)
"The Way It Turns" (2016)
"Paraisong Tanso" (2016)
"MerryGoRound" (2017)
"Segurista" (2018)

Awards and nominations

References

External links
The Dawn official Facebook page

Filipino rock music groups
Musical groups established in 1985
Musical groups from Metro Manila
MCA Music Inc. (Philippines) artists
1985 establishments in the Philippines
PolyEast Records artists